The Welsh Classic was a darts tournament held from 1981.

List of tournaments

Men's

Women's

Youth's

See also
 List of BDO ranked tournaments

References

External links

1981 establishments in Wales
2013 disestablishments in Wales
2019 establishments in Wales
2019 disestablishments in Wales
Darts tournaments